John Makali is a Kenyan politician from Ford-K who has been MP for Kanduyi Constituency since the 2022.

He has been an ODM Member since 2007 until 2022 where he shifted to FORD KENYA under Moses Masika Wetangula.He was the First speaker of Bungoma County Assembly from 2013 to 2017 where he contested for the kanduyi parliamentary seat on ODM after defeating The current Nairobi senator and ODM secretary General Edwin watenya sifuna on nominations but became runners up to the August elections to Ambassador Wafula Wamunyinyi, DAP K party leader then in FORD under Moses Wetangula whom he floored him in the 2022 Parliamentary race.
He is an advocate/lawyer of the Kenyan Highcourt and runs a law Firm in the name of John Makali and  Company's advocate based in Bungoma, Kanduyi, moi avenue.
He also served as Law society chair for Bungoma chapter close to a decade.He is an old boy of Musikoma Primary school, The Mighty Bungoma High school class of 1985 where he was the top student before joining St. Patricks iten for advancement before joining the Migthy university of Nairobi to pursue his Degree in law.
Born and raised at the shores of River khalaba, in Mukhaweli village, Kanduyi constituency to a family of eleven siblings.His parents passed on at an early age, The late MARTINI OKWISIA MAKALI and ELIZABETH ACHUPA.

References

See also 

 13th Parliament of Kenya

Living people
Members of the 13th Parliament of Kenya
Year of birth missing (living people)
Place of birth missing (living people)
21st-century Kenyan politicians
People from Bungoma County
Forum for the Restoration of Democracy – Kenya politicians